The fish species of Hawaii inhabit the Hawaiian archipelago in the central North Pacific Ocean, southwest of the continental United States, southeast of Japan, and northeast of Australia. The islands are part of the State of Hawaii, United States.

At the southeastern end of the archipelago, the eight "main islands" are (from the northwest to southeast) Niihau, Kauai, Oahu, Molokai, Lānai, Kahoolawe, Maui, and Hawaii. The Northwestern Hawaiian Islands include many atolls, and reefs. Due to Hawaii's isolation 30% of the fish are endemic (unique to the island chain).

This archipelago and its oceans are physiographically and ethnologically part of the Polynesian subregion of Oceania.

The climate of Hawaii is typical for a tropical area, although temperatures and humidity tend to be a bit less extreme than other tropical locales due to the constant trade winds blowing from the east.

The surrounding waters are affected by effluents generated and released from the islands themselves. Floating plastic garbage is a problem, and refuse from the Great Pacific Garbage Patch affects its beaches. Other pressures on Hawaii's fish population are its fishing industries and whaling until IWC's moratorium in 1986. In the last century, some commercially fished stocks have decreased by 80-85%.

Due to its isolation, very few native freshwater fish species are found in Hawaii, and none are entirely restricted to freshwater (all are either anadromous, or also found in brackish and marine water in their adult stage).

The seven native fish species regularly seen in fresh water are the flagtail Kuhlia xenura, the mullet Mugil cephalus, the gobies Awaous stamineus, Lentipes concolor, Sicyopterus stimpsoni and Stenogobius hawaiiensis, and the sleeper goby Eleotris sandwicensis. Three of the gobies, A. stamineus, L. concolor and S. stimpsoni, are famous for their ability to climb waterfalls to reach higher sections of freshwater streams. Several other species have been introduced to the freshwater habitats of Hawaii and some of these are invasive.

Species of fish

Images

References

Further reading
 - Total pages: 256

External links
huiwaa.org

 
Fish
Hawaii